Dan & Louis Oyster Bar is a seafood restaurant in Portland, Oregon described by Fodor's as a "Portland landmark".  As its name implies, it specializes in oysters — from Yaquina Bay and beyond — served raw and in an oyster stew the restaurant has been known for since 1919.

The restaurant has been in business at the same location since 1907 when it was founded by Louis C. Wachsmuth as a raw oyster bar.  Louis was the son of Meinert Wachsmuth, a Danish immigrant who had farmed his own oyster beds on Yaquina Bay.  The bay became the home of a farm, the oldest in Oregon, established to provide the oyster bar with a regular supply of oysters.

The menu was expanded in 1919 when Wachsmuth took over the food bar of the Merchant's Exchange Saloon.  Dining rooms were added in 1937 and 1940. The restaurant remains under Wachsmuth family ownership into the 21st century, and is currently operated by Meinert Keoni Wachsmuth.

Dan & Louis Oyster Bar is located in Old Town, at 208 SW Ankeny Street.

History
A descendant of Meinert Wachsmuth, Cory Schreiber, began his restaurant career at Dan & Louis (at the age of 11); years later, he founded his own Portland-based restaurant (Wildwood) and won a James Beard Foundation Award for his cuisine.

See also

 List of oyster bars
 List of seafood restaurants

References

External links

 O is for Oregon and oysters — 12 months of the year, a Portland Tribune article
 Ode to the Oyster, a 2003 review from the Portland Mercury

1907 establishments in Oregon
Old Town Chinatown
Oyster bars in the United States
Privately held companies based in Oregon
Restaurants established in 1907
Seafood restaurants in Portland, Oregon
Southwest Portland, Oregon